Tomorrow La Scala! is a 2002 British comedy film directed by Francesca Joseph and starring Jessica Hynes. It was screened in the Un Certain Regard section at the 2002 Cannes Film Festival.

Plot
An opera company puts on a production of Stephen Sondheim's Sweeney Todd in a prison.

Cast
 Jessica Hynes as Victoria (as Jessica Stevenson)
 Samantha Spiro as Jayney (Mrs. Lovett)
 Shaun Dingwall as Kevin
 Kulvinder Ghir as Rajiv
 Karl Johnson as Sydney
 Dudley Sutton as Dennis
 Mel Raido as Jordan
 Daniel Evans as Jonny Atkins
 Ian Burfield as Walter
 Lucy Bates as Lily (Joanna)
 Bruce Byron as Thomas
 Kevin Dignam as Mikey
 Helene Kvale as The Journalist
 Brenda Longman as Julia (Beggar Woman)
 Phelim McDermott as Cliff
 David Oyelowo as Charlie
 Steven Page as Miles (Sweeney Todd)
 Richard Van Allan as Eugene (The Judge)
 Byron Watson as Dick (Anthony)

References

External links

2002 films
2002 comedy films
British comedy films
2000s English-language films
2000s British films